Hasselt is a Belgian city and municipality.

Hasselt may also refer to:

 Arrondissement of Hasselt, Limburg, Belgium
 Hasselt (Bedburg-Hau), Germany
 Hasselt, Overijssel, Netherlands
 Hasselt, Venlo, Netherlands
 Hasselt University, a university with campuses in Hasselt and Diepenbeek, Belgium
 K.S.C. Hasselt, a Belgian football club

See also

 van Hasselt